This is a list of the rivers in Puducherry, India.

Puducherry Region
 Gingee River
 Guduvaiyar River
 Malattar River
 Pambaiyar River
 Pennaiyar River

Karaikal Region
 Arasalar River
 Nandalar River
 Nattar River
 Noolaar River
 Puravadayanar River
 Thirumalairajan River
 Vanjiar River

Mahe Region
 Mahé River
 Ponniyar River

Yanam Region
 Goutami branch of Godavari River
 Koringa River

See also
 List of Lakes in Puducherry

 
Puducherry
Rivers